Laskówka may refer to the following places in Poland:
Laskówka, Lower Silesian Voivodeship (south-west Poland)
Laskówka, Subcarpathian Voivodeship (south-east Poland)